Sîn-gāmil (inscribed in : DEN.ZU-kà-mi-il) was a king of Uruk during the 18th century BCE, at the time of the Isin-Larsa period.  He was the son of Sîn-irībam, and Ilum-gāmil, his brother succeeded him. 

Sîn-gāmil is also known from one of this dedication tablets.

His son was Salim-palih-Marduk, and, according to their seals, their deities were Marduk and Shamash.

The dynasty of the Kings of Uruk in the 19-18th centuries BCE was composed of the following rulers in chronological order: Alila-hadum, Sumu-binasa, Naram-Sin of Uruk, Sîn-kāšid, Sîn-iribam, Sîn-gamil, Ilum-gamil, Anam, Irdanene, Rim-Anum, Nabi-ilišu, and an unknown king.

References

18th-century BC Sumerian kings
Kings of Uruk